Perry Copse Outcrop is a  geological Site of Special Scientific Interest  in Fernhurst in West Sussex. It is a Geological Conservation Review site.

This site dates to the Early Cretaceous, between 140 and 100 million years ago.

The site is private land with no public access.

References

Sites of Special Scientific Interest in West Sussex
Geological Conservation Review sites